Lori Elaine Lightfoot (born August 4, 1962) is an American politician and attorney serving as the 56th mayor of Chicago since 2019. She is a member of the Democratic Party. Before becoming mayor, Lightfoot worked in private legal practice as a partner at Mayer Brown and held various government positions in Chicago. Most notably, she served as president of the Chicago Police Board and chair of the Chicago Police Accountability Task Force. Lightfoot ran for mayor of Chicago in the 2019 Chicago mayoral election, advancing to a runoff election against Toni Preckwinkle, which Lightfoot won on April 2, 2019. She lost reelection in the first round of the 2023 election, garnering just 17% of the vote and becoming the first one-term Chicago mayor in 40 years.

Lightfoot is the first openly lesbian black woman to serve as mayor of a major city in the United States and the second openly lesbian woman (after Annise Parker) to serve as mayor of one of the ten most populous cities in the United States as well as the first black woman, the second woman (after Jane Byrne), and the third black person (after Harold Washington and Eugene Sawyer) to serve as mayor of Chicago.

Early life and education
Lightfoot was born in Massillon, Ohio, the youngest of four children. Her mother, Ann Lightfoot, was a nighttime healthcare aide and school board member, and her father, Elijah Lightfoot, a local factory worker and janitor. She grew up in a mostly white neighborhood on the west side of the city.

She is a graduate of Washington High School in Massillon, where she was a trumpet player in the school band, sang alto in choir, point guard on the basketball team, volleyball player, softball player, yearbook editor, and Pep Club member. She was elected high school class president three times. Her campaign slogan while running for high school class president was "Get on the right foot with Lightfoot". Her high school alumni association named her a "Distinguished Citizen" in 2013. While in high school, Lightfoot helped organize a boycott of her school's lunch program over the quality of its pizza. Her boycott was a success as the school provided more flavorful pizza. Her punishment for the boycott was detention.

Lightfoot received her Bachelor of Arts in political science from the University of Michigan in 1984, graduating with honors. Despite not knowing the subject, she initially hoped to become a systems engineer following the advice of her oldest brother. She pursued seven different types of employment to pay for her education, including working as a resident assistant and as a cook for the school's football team. She also held factory jobs at home during summers to help pay for her education. While Lightfoot was an undergraduate, her older brother, Brian Lightfoot, was arrested in connection with a bank robbery and the shooting of a security guard.

Lightfoot held positions working for Congress members Ralph Regula and Barbara Mikulski before deciding to attend law school. She has said she chose to attend law school not because of her brother's legal troubles, but because she wanted a job that offered financial independence. She matriculated at the University of Chicago Law School, where she was awarded a full scholarship. As president of the University of Chicago Law School's student body, she led a successful movement to ban a law firm from campus after the firm sent a recruiter who made racist and sexist remarks towards a student. Lightfoot quarterbacked an intramural flag football team while at Chicago Law School. Lightfoot also served as a clerk for Justice Charles Levin of the Michigan Supreme Court. She graduated from the University of Chicago with her Juris Doctor degree in 1989.

Career

Assistant U.S. Attorney (1996–2002) 
After law school, Lightfoot became a practicing attorney at the Mayer Brown law firm, serving a wide cross-section of clients. Lightfoot first entered the public sector as Assistant United States Attorney for the Northern District of Illinois. During her mayoral campaign, Lightfoot cited several reasons for entering public service, including a desire to represent the African-American community, a sense of injustice based on the murder of a family member by a Ku Klux Klan member in the 1920s, and struggles with the law encountered by her older brother, who was charged with possession of crack cocaine with intent to distribute.

While working as a federal prosecutor, Lightfoot helped to prosecute those accused of federal crimes, including drug crimes. She assisted with Operation Silver Shovel, an FBI investigation into Chicago corruption. She helped to convict alderman Virgil Jones. In 1999, Lightfoot was issued a warning for misconduct by judge Richard Posner in a case in which she was found by the United States Court of Appeals for the Seventh Circuit to have misled a United States Circuit Judge regarding a suspect's whereabouts, making it impossible for the judge to stay the suspect's extradition to Norway. Lightfoot and the Justice Department at the time disputed this characterization of her actions.

Chicago Police Department Office of Professional Standards (2002–04) 
In 2002, Lightfoot was appointed chief administrator of the Chicago Police Department Office of Professional Standards, a now-defunct governmental police oversight group, by Police Superintendent Terry Hillard. She held the position for two years. In the position, she was in charge of investigating possible cases of police misconduct, including police shootings of civilians. However, a Chicago Tribune report found that the Office of Professional Standards' investigations often lacked thoroughness. Lightfoot says her recommendations for disciplinary action were often rejected by the police department.

In one notable case, Lightfoot went against Police Department orthodoxy by recommending the firing of officer Alvin Weems, who shot and killed an unarmed man, Michael Pleasance. Weems was initially believed to have accidentally shot Pleasance, but after video evidence contradicting the initial claims was revealed, even Weems himself expressed feeling that the shooting was unjustified. Weems was not fired by the Chicago Police Department, but the city was eventually forced to pay a settlement to the Pleasance family. Weems later committed suicide.

In another controversial case where officer Phyllis Clinkscales shot and killed unarmed 17-year-old Robert Washington, the Chicago Tribune reported that Lightfoot determined that the shooting was justified. In doing so, the Tribune said she reversed the order of her predecessor, who had called for Clinkscales's firing. Clinkscales's account of the events of the shooting had been found to contain untrue statements in an investigation. Lightfoot disputes this account of Clinkscales's case, saying that the police superintendent at the time was responsible for declining Lightfoot's predecessor's finding that the shooting was unjustified. Lightfoot said her action on the case was to push for a 30-day suspension for Clinkscales, which she implied was the most that was possible given the circumstances.

Other roles in Chicago city government (2004–05) 
Lightfoot then moved on to work in the Chicago Office of Emergency Management and Communications. She was later hired by Mayor Richard M. Daley as deputy chief of the Chicago Department of Procurement Services. There, she and her boss, Mary Dempsey, investigated Chicago corruption, drawing Mayor Daley's ire in the process. Lightfoot and Dempsey's investigations included probes of then-Governor of Illinois Rod Blagojevich's associate Tony Rezko and prominent Daley donor Elzie Higginbottom. Lightfoot worked at the Department of Procurement Services for a few months, subsequently returning to Mayer Brown. Lightfoot has suggested that she left the Department of Procurement Services because of dismay at corruption in City Hall.

Private practice 
As an attorney at Mayer Brown, Lightfoot represented Republicans in two cases contesting supposed Democratic gerrymandering. At Mayer Brown, she also defended Chicago police officer Paul Powers against charges of physical assault. In 2019, after facing criticism over defending Powers, Lightfoot cited video evidence in favor of her former client's innocence.

Lightfoot was briefly hired by the city of Chicago to defend the city against charges brought by the family of a mentally ill woman, Christina Eilman, who was brought into custody by Chicago police after suffering a mental breakdown at Midway Airport. Eilman suffered sexual assault and a seven-story fall after being released by police into the dangerous Englewood neighborhood. Eilman's family reached a $22.5 million settlement with the city.

Lightfoot has also served on the boards of the Illinois chapters of NARAL and the ACLU. She has served as external counsel for Bank of America. In 2013, Lightfoot was a finalist for the position of U.S. Attorney for the Northern District of Illinois, but the job went to Zachary T. Fardon.

Chicago Police Board and Task Force (2015–18)

Lightfoot returned to the public sector in 2015, when Mayor Rahm Emanuel appointed her to replace 19-year incumbent Demetrius Carney as president of the Chicago Police Board. The board's main responsibility is to make recommendations for or against disciplinary action on certain disputed cases of police misconduct. Under Lightfoot's leadership, the board became more punitive, firing officers in 72% of its cases. In the wake of the controversy over the murder of Laquan McDonald, Emanuel also appointed Lightfoot as chair of a special Police Accountability Task Force. In 2016, the Task Force, led by Lightfoot, filed a report critical of the Chicago Police Department's practices. She specifically criticized the police union's "code of silence." The anti-police brutality activist organization Black Youth Project 100's Chicago chapter released a statement denouncing Lightfoot and the board and task force for a "lack of accountability."

In 2017, Emanuel re-appointed Lightfoot to a second term as president of the Police Board. The decision came after Lightfoot and Emanuel had publicly come into conflict, particularly over Emanuel's attempts to reach a police reform deal with Trump Administration Justice Department officials that would avoid a consent decree and oversight from a federal judge. Lightfoot called Emanuel's approach "fundamentally flawed." At the time, there was already speculation that Lightfoot was planning a run for mayor of Chicago in 2019, though she denied the rumors. Lightfoot resigned from the Police Board in May 2018, just before announcing her mayoral campaign.

2019 mayoral campaign 

On May 10, 2018, Lightfoot announced her candidacy for Mayor of Chicago in the 2019 elections, her first-ever run for public office. She is the first LGBTQ mayor and first black female mayor of Chicago. Lightfoot was the first openly lesbian candidate in the history of Chicago mayoral elections.

By summer 2018, Lightfoot had the highest-funded campaign of any individual challenging the two-term incumbent Emanuel. In the fall, when it became apparent that he was too damaged by his perceived cover-up of video of the Laquan McDonald shooting, Emanuel dropped out of the race. This allowed high-profile candidates including Gery Chico, Bill Daley, Susana Mendoza and Toni Preckwinkle to enter the race.

Animosity between the Preckwinkle and Lightfoot campaigns was reported as early as October 2018, when Preckwinkle denied rumors that she had pressured Lightfoot to drop out of the race. In December, after Lightfoot submitted the petitions necessary to secure a place on the ballot, Preckwinkle's campaign filed a challenge claiming that many of Lightfoot's petitions were fraudulent. The Chicago Board of Elections Commissioners found Lightfoot had enough valid petitions to remain on the ballot, and Preckwinkle's campaign withdrew its challenge.

In January, the race was upended by a major corruption scandal involving Chicago alderman Ed Burke. Lightfoot ran a television advertisement criticizing Chico, Daley, Mendoza and Preckwinkle as the "Burke Four" for their connections to the disgraced alderman.

Lightfoot picked up several endorsements, including nods from LGBTQ groups and local politicians. In February, Lightfoot won the endorsement of the Chicago Sun-Times editorial board. As close to the election as late January, Lightfoot's support ranged between 2% and 5% in polls. She surged in polls later in the race, consistently polling at or near double-digits in surveys released in the weeks leading up to the election.

On February 18, Lightfoot made headlines after one of her press conferences was crashed by Preckwinkle ally Robert Martwick, with whom Lightfoot then got into a heated exchange.

Shortly before the election, Preckwinkle's campaign manager, Scott Cisek, came under fire after comparing Lightfoot to a Nazi in a Facebook post. Preckwinkle fired Cisek and publicly apologized for his post.

In Chicago, ethnic/racial coalitions had often played a key role in elections. As such, many of the candidates were seen as targeting different groups with their campaigns. Hispanic candidates Gery Chico and Susana Mendoza were seen as vying for the Hispanic vote. Toni Preckwinkle and Willie Wilson were seen as targeting the black vote. Bill Daley was seen as targeting the white vote. Lightfoot was seen as breaking the rules of traditional Chicago politics by not basing her candidacy on seeking the support of particular ethnic/racial groups.

Lightfoot finished first in the February election, in what was considered to be an upset. She placed above a crowded field of fourteen candidates. Because no candidate reached the necessary 50% of the vote needed to win the election outright, she and Preckwinkle advanced to a runoff election.

In the runoff, both the Sun-Times and the Chicago Tribune endorsed Lightfoot. Several former candidates, including Mendoza, Chico, Paul Vallas, and fourth-place finisher Willie Wilson also endorsed Lightfoot in the runoff. Lightfoot held a substantial lead over Preckwinkle in polls conducted during the runoff campaign.

During the runoff, Lightfoot faced criticism from criminal justice activists over her record in police accountability and as a prosecutor. Chicago-based musician and activist Chancelor Bennett, also known as Chance the Rapper, voiced similar concerns in his runoff endorsement of Preckwinkle. Bennett, a former Amara Enyia supporter and son of Preckwinkle's campaign co-chair, said Lightfoot's record as a prosecutor and Chicago Police Department employee has worked against the interests of the black community in Chicago. U.S. Representative Bobby Rush, who endorsed Preckwinkle in the runoff after supporting Daley in the general election, made similar criticisms of Lightfoot centered around criminal justice issues. Lightfoot defended herself against Bennett's criticisms at a mayoral debate, citing her personal experiences with racial discrimination as evidence she would take the concerns of the black community into account. Lightfoot also faced activist criticism over comments at a University of Chicago forum, where she suggested turning some shuttered schools in the city into police academies. Lightfoot later disavowed this suggestion via Twitter.

In the runoff, Lightfoot received endorsements from seven of the twelve candidates that had been eliminated in the first round (these endorsements coming from Gery Chico, Jerry Joyce, John Kozlar, Susana Mendoza, Neal Sales-Griffin, Paul Vallas, and Willie Wilson). Preckwinkle, by contrast, received no endorsements at all from any candidates that had been eliminated in the first round.

Lightfoot won the runoff election on April 2, 2019, becoming mayor-elect of Chicago. She won more than 73% of the overall vote in the runoff, winning in all 50 wards of the city. Lightfoot won all but 20 of the city's 2,069 voting precincts. Voter turnout was 32.89%, almost a record low.

Chart of progression of  Lightfoot's poll numbers in first round

Mayor of Chicago

Lightfoot took office on May 20, 2019. Incumbent mayor Rahm Emanuel reportedly modeled the transition between his and Lightfoot's administrations on the U.S. presidential transition between the George W. Bush and Barack Obama administrations. Emanuel was part of the Bush-Obama transition as Obama's chief of staff designate. Lightfoot endorsed the comparison between her transition and the Bush-Obama transition.

On April 4, Lightfoot named key members of her transition team: her campaign manager Manny Perez to serve as intergovernmental advisor, Maurice Classen to serve as her chief of staff, Sarah Pang and Ra Joy to serve as senior advisors, and Lisa Schneider-Fabes to serve as transition manager.

As mayor-elect, Lightfoot expressed a desire for the Laquan McDonald trial to be reexamined, urging the U.S. Attorney's Office to reopen their grand jury investigation to examine if any civil rights were violated.

On April 6, 2019, Lightfoot told the Chicago Sun-Times that her staff would, during her first post-election weekend, spend time examining the city's 600-page agreement with Sterling Bay regarding the Lincoln Yards development. During her campaign, Lightfoot had been critical of the process that was being taken to reach the agreement. The following Monday, at her request, Mayor Rahm Emanuel postponed city council votes on the approval of $1.6 billion in tax increment financing subsidies for both the Lincoln Yards and The 78 mega-developments. After the developers of the two projects agreed to increase commitments to hiring minority-owned and women-owned contractors, Lightfoot announced that she now supported the deals, which were approved one day subsequent to her declaration of support.

One week before her inauguration, Lightfoot named lawyer and activist Candace Moore as Chicago's first-ever chief equity officer, a job in which Moore will focus on countering racial inequality in the city.

Three days before taking office, Lightfoot named Alderman Scott Waguespack to serve as finance committee chairman, Alderman Pat Dowell to serve as budget chairman, Alderman Tom Tunney to serve as zoning chairman and Alderman Gilbert Villegas to serve as floor leader and economic development chair.

Inauguration 

On May 20, 2019, Lightfoot officially took office as Mayor of Chicago, after being sworn in at 11:15 am by Magistrate Judge Susan E. Cox of the U.S. District Court for the Northern District of Illinois, at the Wintrust Arena, accompanied by her wife and daughter.

Upon taking office, Lightfoot became the first openly LGBT Chicago mayor, the first black female Chicago mayor, as well as the second female Chicago mayor (after Jane Byrne) and third Chicago black mayor (after Harold Washington and Eugene Sawyer).

Affordable housing 
On October 14, 2019, Lightfoot announced the creation of an affordable housing task force set to consist of 20 members and study solutions to housing affordability over a 4- to 6-month period.  The following month, it was announced that the task force would also come up with a proposal to rewrite the city's affordable housing ordinance. These efforts directly implicated systemic racism as the primary issue in housing affordability, recommending an entirely new framework for housing ordinances prioritizing racial equity. However, initial affordable housing goals were set back by budget shortfalls due to the COVID-19 pandemic. Many of these recommendations were eventually integrated into the distribution of federal relief funds for housing assistance grants, as well as allocations for low-income tax credits.

On March 6, 2020, Lightfoot named Tracey Scott as CEO of the Chicago Housing Authority. On March 30, the CHA Board of Commissioners approved Tracey Scott's appointment.

Casino 

After legislation expanding gambling in Illinois was passed by the state legislature at the start of June 2019, Lightfoot announced that the city would commence study of where a Chicago casino would be located. Lightfoot's predecessors had long sought to obtain a casino for the city. While the state did not approve a city-owned casino (reportedly preferred by Lightfoot, as it had been by her predecessors); state legislation allowed for a privately owned casino from which the city would receive one third of tax revenue generated. Lightfoot has continued to push, however, for the state to authorize a casino jointly owned by the city and state and with a lesser effective tax rate than the passed legislation specified.

On May 5, 2022, Lightfoot announced that she had selected the bid from the Bally's Corporation to construct a casino resort on the west bank of the Chicago River.

City Council 

Lightfoot's first executive order as mayor limited "aldermanic prerogative", a practice under which Chicago aldermen were granted an effective veto over matters in their wards.

On May 28, 2019, Lightfoot unveiled proposals to revise the operating rules of the Chicago City Council. Among other things she proposed live streaming video of committee meetings, changes to strengthen the rule on conflicts of interest and the transfer of control over TIF subsidies to the council's Committee on Economic and Capital Development.

Lightfoot has butted heads with embattled Alderman Ed Burke. On May 29, 2019, during the first city council meeting, over which Lightfoot presided, she held her ground in debating issues with Alderman Burke. On May 31, after indictments were brought against Burke, Lightfoot called for his resignation.

On June 5, 2019, Lightfoot outlined further ethics reform proposals for the city council.

Crime 

It was reported that by June 17, 2021, Chicago led the nation in mass shootings, average approximately one per week. In response to the third mass shooting in four days, Lightfoot said: "We are part of a club of cities to which no one wants to belong: cities with mass shootings."

Education 
On June 3, 2019, Lightfoot announced her selections for the Chicago Board of Education (the school board of Chicago Public Schools), appointing former City Clerk of Chicago Miguel del Valle as its president. She also announced that incumbent CEO of Chicago Public Schools Janice K. Jackson would retain her position, having previously only committed to retaining her for an interim period.

In October 2019, Lightfoot dealt with a public schools strike led by the Chicago Teachers Union and Service Employees International Union.

While Lightfoot has advocated for an elected Chicago school board, as mayor-elect she opposed state legislation that would create a 21-member board, calling it "unwieldy". Nevertheless, in July 2021, governor J. B. Pritzker signed such legislation into law, over Lightfoot's objections.

On June 14, 2021, Lightfoot named José Torres to serve as interim CEO of the Chicago Public Schools after Janice K. Jackson steps down. On September 15, 2021, Mayor Lightfoot announced that Pedro Martinez would be succeeding Torres as the new permanent CEO. On September 22, the Chicago Board of Education unanimously voted to approve his appointment as CEO, scheduling him to take office on September 29.

Fiscal issues 
On November 23, 2019, a plan by Lightfoot to increase the minimum wage to $15 an hour by 2021 was approved by the Chicago City Council. This increase did not include restaurant servers and tipped workers.

Among proposals Lightfoot floated in the fall of 2019 included a graduated transfer tax for commercial real estate sales.  This plan would allow the city to capture more money from large real estate transfers, while also providing a tax break for the 85% of real estate transfers valued under $500,000.

On November 26, 2019, the Chicago City Council approved Lightfoot's budget for the 2020 fiscal year.

Public safety and police 
Shortly after taking office, Lightfoot faced what was regarded as her first test at public safety, as Memorial Day weekend in Chicago had, in previous years, often been a period in which Chicago had seen a spike in violence. In an attempt to eschew this pattern, Lightfoot initiated Our City. Our Safety., under which extra police patrols were stationed in busy locations, as well as in troubled spots, and free youth programs were organized by the Chicago Park District at about a hundred locations. A notable extent of violence was still witnessed over the weekend, to which Lightfoot responded, "We can’t claim victory and we certainly can’t celebrate. We have much more work to do."

On May 28, 2019, Lightfoot outlined a plan to focus on reducing the city's gun violence.

On May 28, 2019, Lightfoot urged city council to pass an ordinance within her first hundred days that would establish a level of civilian oversight on the Chicago Police Department.

Lightfoot launched a community policing initiative in June 2019. Later that month she announced that the city's police department would not assist U.S. Immigration and Customs Enforcement (ICE) raids, denying ICE access to the city's police database in an effort to prevent the city's illegal immigrant population from facing deportation.

On November 8, 2019, after Eddie T. Johnson announced that he would resign from his position as superintendent of the Chicago Police Department, Lightfoot named Charlie Beck to serve as interim superintendent of the Chicago Police Department. On December 2, rather than letting Johnson voluntarily retire, Lightfoot fired him due to what she declared were "intolerable" actions by him and him misleading the public. Lightfoot nominated David Brown to be superintendent of police on April 2, 2020. After Beck stepped down on April 15, Brown became acting superintendent, while pending confirmation to serve on a permanent basis.

On November 13, 2019, Lightfoot proposed an ordinance that would create a new Office of Public Safety Administration, which would combine administrative functions of Chicago Police Department, the Chicago Fire Department and the Office of Public Safety Administration. The ordinance would also move the task of hearing appeals from rejected Chicago police applicants whose names have been removed from the department's eligibility list from the Human Resources Board to the purview of the Chicago Police Board.

In June 2020, Lightfoot voiced her opposition to an ordinance proposed by alderman Roderick Sawyer, which would end the Chicago Public Schools' contract to station Chicago Police Department officers at schools.

In May 2021, Lightfoot nominated Annette Nance-Holt to be the city fire commissioner. She was confirmed to the position by the Chicago City Council on June 23. Nance-Holt is the first woman to serve in a permanent capacity as the commissioner of the Chicago Fire Department.

2020 coronavirus pandemic 

During the COVID-19 pandemic in the United States, Lightfoot has been taking a number of actions aimed at quelling the severity of the outbreak in Chicago.  On March 11, 2020, Lightfoot joined Illinois Governor J. B. Pritzker to postpone of the city's formal Saint Patrick's Day festivities (including parades and the dyeing of the Chicago River).  On March 15, Lightfoot decided that, due to concerns surrounding Saint Patrick's Day festivities, all businesses selling liquor must have less than half of their regular maximum capacity, and must additionally not exceed a capacity of 100 people.

On March 12, 2020, Lightfoot again joined Pritzker to issue, among other things, a ban on events attended by more than 1,000 people from being held over the next 30 days. In response to the pandemic, she created the Racial Equity Rapid Response Team as well as the COVID-19 Recovery Task Force.

On March 15, Lightfoot criticized the long lines at Chicago's O'Hare International Airport as a result of federal government travel restrictions related to the coronavirus pandemic as "utterly unacceptable". Under the federal government's travel restrictions, authorized passengers could only take flights from 26 permitted European nations to a total of thirteen permitted United States airports, of which O'Hare was one.

On March 20, 2020, Lightfoot extended Chicago Public School closures beyond what had already been mandated by the State of Illinois. Chicago Department of Health Commissioner, Dr. Allison Arwady, had signed a public health order under which those with the COVID-19 illness or exhibiting symptoms, with few exceptions, could not leave their place of residence, go to work or any group settings. The order allowed sick residents to seek essential services, such as necessary clinical care/evaluation, and life sustaining needs, such as medicine and food. Lightfoot declared that anyone who violated this order may be issued a citation.

On March 27, Lightfoot placed a ban on contact sport and closed the city's parks, beaches, and trails due to instances over the previous days of people violating the state's stay-at-home order and gathering in public places.

On March 31, 2020, Lightfoot announced that she had secured 300 hotel rooms in the city's downtown to house first responders, which they could use so that they would not need to go to their homes and risk spreading COVID-19 to their families.

Lightfoot's administration worked with the United States Army Corps of Engineers to establish a makeshift hospital at McCormick Place.

In early April, Lightfoot partnered with Chicago's professional sports teams to launch the "We Are Not Playing" campaign.

Also in early April, Lightfoot drew criticism for getting her hair cut in violation of the state's stay-at-home order. She argued that she was justified in doing so, saying, "I’m the public face of this city. I’m on national media and I’m out in the public eye."

On April 7, Lightfoot signed an executive order which further ensured that undocumented immigrants would not be excluded from receiving city benefits, opportunities, and services. Similar protections already largely existed under the Welcoming City Ordinance, which had been passed during her predecessor's term.

On April 8, Lightfoot introduced a curfew on liquor sales to take effect the next day. This was to cut down on congregating outside of liquor stores.

Also on April 8, Lightfoot was criticised for suspending Freedom of Information Act request deadlines, saying "I want to ask the average Chicagoan: Would you like them to do their job or would you like them to be pulled off to do FOIA requests?", and invoking the Old Testament by saying "I’m mindful of the fact that we’re in the Pesach season, the angel of death that we all talk about is the Passover story". Due to this, Lightfoot was subsequently awarded the tongue-in-cheek "Pharaoh Prize for Deadline Extensions" by digital-rights group the Electronic Frontier Foundation.

Lightfoot has participated in enforcing the state's stay-at-home order, personally partaking in patrolling the city and confronting violators.

Lightfoot-centric internet memes arose during the coronavirus outbreak, first gaining popularity in late-March amid Lightfoot's no-nonsense approach to enforcing the state's stay-at-home order.

On November 12, 2020, to be effective on November 16, Lightfoot issued new restrictions, including a stay-at-home advisory. Lightfoot was scrutinized for this decision as she had been seen in prior days at a large gathering celebrating Joe Biden's election victory.

2020 Black Lives Matter police violence protests 
During the 2020 Black Lives Matter (BLM) anti-police violence protests sparked by the murder of George Floyd, Lightfoot, who campaigned as a police reformer, stated that police unions have continued to be one of the main obstacles to reform of the department:

Lightfoot further stated that police violence and brutality "demean the badge" and asked the public to report police misconduct.

On May 31, during a conference call with all 50 Chicago aldermen, Lightfoot got into a heated argument with fellow Democrat Raymond Lopez of the 15th Ward. The two swore at one another after Lopez criticized the mayor's response to looting and rioting during the George Floyd protests.

In August 2020, she came under criticism for not allowing protests on the block where she lives. Lightfoot said this was justified because she had received threats.

Other staffing decisions and appointments 
On May 20, 2019, Lightfoot announced the retention of several administrators who had worked under the previous Emanuel administration, alongside a number of new hires.

On September 30, 2019, Lightfoot hired former alderman John Arena as a special advisor in the city's planning department.

In December 2019, Lightfoot nominated Gia Biagi to serve as the commissioner of the Chicago Department of Transportation. Biagi was confirmed by the Chicago City Council to the position on January 15, 2020.

Other issues 
On May 28, 2019, Lightfoot laid out plans to pass "fair work week" legislation tightening rules surrounding workplace scheduling.

On November 26, 2019, the city council approved ordinances Lightfoot had put forth placing restrictions on vehicle impoundment and lowering fines for illegal possession of cannabis.

In early February 2020, Lightfoot joined with Illinois U.S. Senator Dick Durbin to urge the Federal Emergency Management Agency to declare the damage being inflicted on the city's lakefront by historically high Lake Michigan water levels to receive federal disaster designation.

In late February 2020, Lightfoot hosted a summit at University of Illinois at Chicago addressing the issue of poverty.

Other controversies 
On May 19, 2021, Lightfoot stated she would only choose reporters of color for interviews on the occasion of her two-year anniversary in office. This sparked considerable backlash, with many calling for her resignation, including Tulsi Gabbard.  Judicial Watch sued Lightfoot on behalf of The Daily Caller, alleging Lightfoot violated journalist Thomas Catenacci’s First and Fourteenth Amendment rights.

2023 mayoral campaign 
In the 2023 Chicago Mayoral elections, Lightfoot failed to make it into the run-offs after she only garnered 17.06% of the vote behind Paul Vallas and Brandon Johnson, who gained 33.77% and 20.29% respectively. This means that after the run-off in April, Chicago will have a new mayor.

Approval rating

Below is a table of polls on Lightfoot's approval rating among Chicagoans, descending from most to least recent:

Notes on polls
 6% "strongly approve", 19% "somewhat approve", 25% "somewhat disapprove", 48% "strongly disapprove", and 2% "not sure".

National politics
On March 6, 2020, shortly before the 2020 Illinois Democratic presidential primary, Lightfoot endorsed Joe Biden's candidacy for president.

Lightfoot appeared in a video shown on the opening night of the 2020 Democratic National Convention which also features Biden, Houston Police Chief Art Acevedo, activist Jamira Burley, activist Gwen Carr, and NAACP President Derrick Johnson.

Lightfoot was a 2020 Democratic United States Electoral College elector from Illinois, casting her votes for Biden as president and Kamala Harris as vice-president.

Personal life
Lightfoot resides in the Logan Square neighborhood, on Chicago's Northwest Side. On May 31, 2014, she married Amy Eshleman, a former Chicago Public Library employee, who is now a full-time mother to the couple's adopted daughter.

Lightfoot has held Chicago Bears season tickets for 20 years, and is also a Chicago White Sox season ticket-holder. She is also a season ticket holder for the WNBA's Chicago Sky.

Lightfoot made an appearance on a TV mini-series called The Second City Presents: The Last Show Left on Earth.

Lightfoot is a Founding Trustee at Christ the King Jesuit High School in Chicago. She is also a member of St. James AME Zion Church.

Awards and honors 

In June 2019, Lightfoot was selected as one of several grand marshals of the Chicago Pride Parade.

In June 2020, in honor of the 50th anniversary of the first LGBTQ Pride parade, Queerty named her among the fifty heroes “leading the nation toward equality, acceptance, and dignity for all people”.

In October 2020, Lightfoot was chosen by the National Minority Quality Forum (NMQF) to receive the NMQF Honorable John Lewis Lifetime Achievement Award.

Electoral history

See also
 List of mayors of the 50 largest cities in the United States
 List of the first LGBT holders of political offices in the United States

Notes

References

External links

 Office of the Mayor at City of Chicago
 
 Lori Lightfoot News

 
1962 births
20th-century American lawyers
21st-century American lawyers
21st-century American women politicians
21st-century American politicians
African-American lawyers
African-American mayors in Illinois
African-American women lawyers
Assistant United States Attorneys
Illinois Democrats
Lawyers from Chicago
Lesbian politicians
LGBT African Americans
LGBT appointed officials in the United States
LGBT Christians
LGBT lawyers
LGBT mayors of places in the United States
LGBT people from Illinois
LGBT people from Ohio
Living people
Mayors of Chicago
People from Massillon, Ohio
University of Michigan College of Literature, Science, and the Arts alumni
University of Chicago Law School alumni
Women mayors of places in Illinois
20th-century American women lawyers
21st-century American women lawyers
2020 United States presidential electors
African-American women mayors
People associated with Mayer Brown